Too Much Lip (2018) is a novel by Australian author Melissa Lucashenko. It was shortlisted for the 2019 Victorian Premier's Literary Award for Indigenous Writing and the Stella Award. It was the winner of the 2019 Miles Franklin Award.

Plot summary

Protagonist Kerry returns to her hometown of Durrongo on a stolen Harley to bid farewell to her dying grandfather. A fugitive with warrants out for her arrest, she does not intend to stay in town for long. However she soon becomes embroiled in dramas with regards to her family, her local family history, and the overdevelopment of the local community, and unexpectedly finds love with a local dugai (white man) named Steve.

Awards 

 Stella Prize - 2019 - Shortlisted
Australian Book Industry Awards - 2019 - Longlisted
 Miles Franklin Award - 2019 - Winner
Queensland Literary Awards - Courier Mail People’s Choice Award - 2019 - Shortlisted
Queensland Literary Awards - Queensland Premier's Award for a work of State Significance - 2019 - Shortlisted
Queensland Literary Awards - The University of Queensland Fiction Book Award - 2019 - Shortlisted
Prime Minister's Literary Awards - 2019 - Shortlisted
Victorian Premier's Literary Award for Indigenous Writing - Shortlisted
Voss Literary Prize - 2019 - Shortlisted

References

Further reading

Melissa Lucashenko: Too Much Lip was a frightening book to write
Stella Prize assessment
Author Melissa Lucashenko aims for the heart by Maxine Beneba Clarke

2018 Australian novels
Novels by Melissa Lucashenko
Miles Franklin Award-winning works
University of Queensland Press books